The Braille pattern dots-3456 is a 6-dot braille cell with the top right, middle right, and both bottom dots raised, or an 8-dot braille cell with the top right, upper-middle right, and both lower-middle dots raised. It is represented by the Unicode code point U+283c, and in Braille ASCII with a number sign: #.

Unified Braille

In unified international braille, the braille pattern dots-3456 is used as a number indicator.

Table of unified braille values

† Abolished in Unified English Braille

Other braille

Plus dots 7 and 8

Related to Braille pattern dots-3456 are Braille patterns 34567, 34568, and 345678, which are used in 8-dot braille systems, such as Gardner-Salinas and Luxembourgish Braille.

Related 8-dot kantenji patterns

In the Japanese kantenji braille, the standard 8-dot Braille patterns 5678, 15678, 45678, and 145678 are the patterns related to Braille pattern dots-3456, since the two additional dots of kantenji patterns 03456, 34567, and 034567 are placed above the base 6-dot cell, instead of below, as in standard 8-dot braille.

Kantenji using braille patterns 5678, 15678, 45678, or 145678

This listing includes kantenji using Braille pattern dots-3456 for all 6349 kanji found in JIS C 6226-1978.

  - 火

Variants and thematic compounds

  -  selector 4 + 火  =  非
  -  火 + selector 1  =  熱
  -  火 + 宿  =  蛍
  -  比 + 火  =  丈

Compounds of 火

  -  よ/广 + 火  =  灰
  -  る/忄 + よ/广 + 火  =  恢
  -  え/訁 + よ/广 + 火  =  詼
  -  か/金 + 火  =  災
  -  と/戸 + 火  =  炉
  -  火 + 火  =  炎
  -  に/氵 + 火  =  淡
  -  え/訁 + 火  =  談
  -  れ/口 + 火 + 火  =  啖
  -  せ/食 + 火 + 火  =  毯
  -  や/疒 + 火 + 火  =  痰
  -  そ/馬 + 火 + 火  =  犖
  -  や/疒 + 火  =  炭
  -  の/禾 + 火  =  秋
  -  心 + 火  =  萩
  -  れ/口 + の/禾 + 火  =  啾
  -  る/忄 + の/禾 + 火  =  愀
  -  心 + の/禾 + 火  =  楸
  -  に/氵 + の/禾 + 火  =  湫
  -  か/金 + の/禾 + 火  =  鍬
  -  と/戸 + の/禾 + 火  =  鞦
  -  せ/食 + の/禾 + 火  =  鰍
  -  み/耳 + 火  =  耿
  -  火 + て/扌  =  灯
  -  火 + す/発  =  灸
  -  火 + ん/止  =  炊
  -  火 + そ/馬  =  炒
  -  火 + ほ/方  =  炙
  -  火 + ま/石  =  焙
  -  火 + き/木  =  焚
  -  火 + つ/土  =  焼
  -  火 + 火 + つ/土  =  燒
  -  火 + ひ/辶  =  煉
  -  火 + に/氵  =  煙
  -  火 + る/忄  =  煤
  -  火 + ⺼  =  煥
  -  火 + お/頁  =  煩
  -  火 + と/戸  =  燈
  -  火 + ろ/十  =  燎
  -  火 + の/禾  =  燐
  -  火 + う/宀/#3  =  燥
  -  火 + さ/阝  =  燦
  -  火 + く/艹  =  燻
  -  火 + ふ/女  =  燼
  -  火 + こ/子  =  爆
  -  火 + た/⽥  =  畑
  -  き/木 + 宿 + 火  =  樮
  -  火 + 比 + も/門  =  灼
  -  火 + selector 1 + す/発  =  炬
  -  火 + も/門 + selector 2  =  炮
  -  火 + 宿 + 囗  =  炯
  -  火 + 数 + へ/⺩  =  炳
  -  火 + 宿 + さ/阝  =  炸
  -  火 + す/発 + れ/口  =  烙
  -  火 + 囗 + け/犬  =  烟
  -  火 + 囗 + れ/口  =  烱
  -  火 + 宿 + ほ/方  =  烽
  -  火 + 宿 + ぬ/力  =  焔
  -  火 + 日 + 比  =  焜
  -  火 + 日 + へ/⺩  =  煌
  -  火 + 宿 + 仁/亻  =  煖
  -  火 + 龸 + ろ/十  =  煢
  -  火 + 宿 + 数  =  煬
  -  火 + と/戸 + む/車  =  煽
  -  火 + め/目 + 心  =  熄
  -  火 + う/宀/#3 + た/⽥  =  熔
  -  火 + を/貝 + こ/子  =  熕
  -  火 + と/戸 + ね/示  =  熨
  -  火 + 宿 + 日  =  熾
  -  火 + 宿 + 氷/氵  =  燉
  -  火 + の/禾 + た/⽥  =  燔
  -  火 + も/門 + 日  =  燗
  -  火 + 囗 + の/禾  =  燠
  -  火 + selector 2 + そ/馬  =  燧
  -  火 + ぬ/力 + の/禾  =  燬
  -  火 + 宿 + む/車  =  燭
  -  火 + selector 4 + ゑ/訁  =  燮
  -  火 + ひ/辶 + た/⽥  =  燵
  -  火 + 宿 + そ/馬  =  燹
  -  火 + 宿 + や/疒  =  燿
  -  火 + 日 + ゐ/幺  =  爍
  -  と/戸 + と/戸 + 火  =  爐
  -  火 + も/門 + ひ/辶  =  爛
  -  火 + 囗 + り/分  =  爨
  -  け/犬 + 宿 + 火  =  狄
  -  火 + う/宀/#3 + へ/⺩  =  瑩
  -  心 + 宿 + 火  =  荻
  -  ひ/辶 + 宿 + 火  =  逖
  -  せ/食 + 宿 + 火  =  餤
  -  火 + 宿 + せ/食  =  鶯

Compounds of 非

  -  な/亻 + 火  =  俳
  -  ゆ/彳 + 火  =  徘
  -  て/扌 + 火  =  排
  -  ゐ/幺 + 火  =  緋
  -  ゑ/訁 + 火  =  誹
  -  火 + 心  =  悲
  -  火 + 龸  =  斐
  -  火 + む/車  =  輩
  -  も/門 + selector 4 + 火  =  匪
  -  と/戸 + selector 4 + 火  =  扉
  -  日 + selector 4 + 火  =  暃
  -  へ/⺩ + selector 4 + 火  =  琲
  -  ⺼ + selector 4 + 火  =  腓
  -  心 + selector 4 + 火  =  菲
  -  む/車 + selector 4 + 火  =  蜚
  -  ね/示 + selector 4 + 火  =  裴
  -  ち/竹 + selector 4 + 火  =  霏
  -  龸 + selector 4 + 火  =  韭
  -  せ/食 + selector 4 + 火  =  鯡
  -  さ/阝 + selector 4 + 火  =  齏
  -  火 + む/車 + selector 2  =  翡
  -  心 + 龸 + 火  =  薤
  -  火 + こ/子 + く/艹  =  靠
  -  ま/石 + 宿 + 火  =  靡
  -  心 + う/宀/#3 + 火  =  韮
  -  さ/阝 + 龸 + 火  =  韲

Compounds of 熱 and 灬

  -  き/木 + 火 + selector 1  =  杰
  -  龸 + 火  =  為
  -  龸 + 龸 + 火  =  爲
  -  え/訁 + 龸 + 火  =  譌
  -  仁/亻 + 火  =  偽
  -  仁/亻 + 仁/亻 + 火  =  僞
  -  ぬ/力 + 火  =  勲
  -  ぬ/力 + ぬ/力 + 火  =  勳
  -  れ/口 + 火  =  点
  -  れ/口 + れ/口 + 火  =  點
  -  ほ/方 + 火  =  烈
  -  む/車 + 火  =  無
  -  れ/口 + む/車 + 火  =  嘸
  -  よ/广 + む/車 + 火  =  廡
  -  る/忄 + む/車 + 火  =  憮
  -  て/扌 + む/車 + 火  =  撫
  -  心 + む/車 + 火  =  蕪
  -  い/糹/#2 + 火  =  焦
  -  ま/石 + 火  =  礁
  -  る/忄 + い/糹/#2 + 火  =  憔
  -  き/木 + い/糹/#2 + 火  =  樵
  -  心 + い/糹/#2 + 火  =  蕉
  -  け/犬 + 火  =  然
  -  火 + け/犬  =  燃
  -  て/扌 + け/犬 + 火  =  撚
  -  日 + 火  =  照
  -  ら/月 + 火  =  熊
  -  す/発 + ら/月 + 火  =  羆
  -  お/頁 + 火  =  熟
  -  火 + 氷/氵  =  烝
  -  火 + ら/月  =  煎
  -  火 + 日  =  煮
  -  氷/氵 + 火  =  潟
  -  う/宀/#3 + 火  =  窯
  -  く/艹 + 火  =  薫
  -  火 + せ/食  =  鴬
  -  火 + 龸 + ま/石  =  烹
  -  火 + selector 2 + き/木  =  煕
  -  火 + も/門 + selector 5  =  煦
  -  火 + 宿 + き/木  =  熈
  -  く/艹 + 宿 + 火  =  熏
  -  火 + selector 3 + ほ/方  =  熬
  -  火 + つ/土 + 囗  =  熹
  -  せ/食 + く/艹 + 火  =  醺
  -  火 + な/亻 + き/木  =  烋
  -  火 + う/宀/#3 + り/分  =  竃
  -  そ/馬 + 宿 + 火  =  羮
  -  そ/馬 + 龸 + 火  =  羹

Compounds of 蛍

  -  火 + 火 + 宿  =  螢
  -  火 + 宿 + つ/土  =  塋
  -  火 + 宿 + り/分  =  竈

Compounds of 丈

  -  き/木 + 火  =  杖
  -  な/亻 + 比 + 火  =  仗

Other compounds

  -  ふ/女 + 火  =  尽
  -  ふ/女 + ふ/女 + 火  =  盡
  -  仁/亻 + ふ/女 + 火  =  儘
  -  つ/土 + ふ/女 + 火  =  壗
  -  を/貝 + ふ/女 + 火  =  贐
  -  な/亻 + ふ/女 + 火  =  侭
  -  ひ/辶 + 火  =  滅
  -  す/発 + 火  =  虚
  -  火 + れ/口  =  嘘
  -  つ/土 + す/発 + 火  =  墟
  -  ん/止 + す/発 + 火  =  歔
  -  火 + ぬ/力  =  勢
  -  う/宀/#3 + 宿 + 火  =  窰

Notes

Braille patterns